Jenny Hu (Chinese: 胡燕妮 wu yin ne/hu yian ni; born 17 November 1945), is a Hong Kong actress of Chinese and German origin best known for her leads in Shaw Brothers productions throughout the 1960s and early 1970s.

Early life 
Hu was born in Guangdong, China to a Chinese father and German mother. After her father's death, she moved to Germany from Taipei until she finished high school.

Career 
With Hu's Eurasian looks, she appealed to the Chinese community and she became an instant hit. Hu was a popular movie actress and her films were translated into Mandarin Chinese. Bruce Lee's martial arts caused Shaw management to focus on action-filled movies as the box office sales were way better.

In 1966, Hu made her debut in the film Till the End of Time (何日君再來). Hu was actively acting until she was about 30.

In 2004, Hu appeared in Yesterday Once More (2004), by Hong Kong filmmaker Johnnie To.

Personal life 
In 1966, Hu secretly married Kang Wei. In 1969, Hu moved to Taiwan. They have two sons. In 1983, Hu and her family moved to Los Angeles, California.

Her son, Terence Yin (尹子維), is also in the film industry.

Filmography
 1966 Till the End of Time (何日君再來) 
 1967 Madame Slender Plum (慾海情魔)
 1967 Black Falcon (黑鷹)
 1967 Four Sisters
 1968  Summer Heat - Judy.
 1969 Torrent of Desire
 1969  Farewell, My Love
 1969 River of Tears
 1970 Young Lovers
 1970 Love Without End
 1970  Guess who Killed My Twelve Lovers (噴火美人魚) 
 1971 The Wedding Song
 1961 My Beloved
 1971 Maria - Maria.
 1971 Secret of My Millionaire Sister 
 1972 Love Affairs
 2972 Cheating Panorama
 1972 Impetuous Fire
 1972 The Peeper, the Model and the Hypnotist
 1972 The Notorious Ones
 1972 Love is Smoke 
 1972 Jenny and Her Sexy Mother
 1972 The Stealing Love
 1972 Hong Kong Criminal Crimes
 1973 Back Street 
 1973 My Love, My Sin
 1973 Death Comes in Three
 1974 Wild as the Waves
 1974 The Paradise
 1974 Rhythm of the Wave
 1974 Young Passion
 1974 The Silver Band
 1975 I & O 
 1975 Bar Girl 
 1976 Love of Strange Talk 
 1978 To Love Or Not To Love
 1979 How Big! How Big! 
 1981 Daughter and Father     
 2004 Yesterday Once More

References

External links

 HK Cinemagic entry

1947 births
Living people
Hong Kong film actresses
Beauticians
Actresses from Guangdong
Actresses from Guangzhou
Hong Kong people of German descent
20th-century Hong Kong actresses
21st-century Hong Kong actresses